Edgard Gijsen (29 January 1940 – 31 July 2008) was a Brazilian rower. He competed in the men's double sculls event at the 1968 Summer Olympics.

References

1940 births
2008 deaths
Brazilian male rowers
Olympic rowers of Brazil
Rowers at the 1968 Summer Olympics
Sportspeople from Antwerp
Pan American Games medalists in rowing
Pan American Games gold medalists for Brazil
Pan American Games silver medalists for Brazil
Pan American Games bronze medalists for Brazil
Rowers at the 1959 Pan American Games
Rowers at the 1963 Pan American Games
Rowers at the 1971 Pan American Games